HSG Wetzlar is a professional handball club from Wetzlar, Germany. It competes in the top-tier Handball-Bundesliga and in the German Handball Cup.

Crest, colours, supporters

Kits

Accomplishments
DHB-Pokal final:
1997, 2001
EHF Cup Winner's Cup final:
1998

Rivalry
HSG Wetzlar's arch-rival is the neighbouring club TV Hüttenberg and games between the clubs are considered as the "Mittelhessenderby".

Team

Current squad
Squad for the 2022–23 season

Goalkeepers
 11  Till Klimpke
 12  Anadin Suljaković
 16  Leonard Grazioli
Left Wingers
 18  Lukas Becher
 33  Emil Mellegård
Right Wingers
 19  Lars Weissgerber
 75  Domen Novak
Line players
4  Adam Nyfjäll
8  Erik Schmidt
 27  Nikita Pliuto

Left Backs
5  Filip Kuzmanovski  
 28  Hendrik Wagner
 44  Lenny Rubin
Central Backs
 21  Jonas Schelker
 23  Magnus Fredriksen
Right Backs
 10  Jovica Nikolić
 77  Stefan Čavor

Transfers
Transfers for the season 2023–24

Joining
  Radojica Čepić (CB) (back from loan at  AEK H.C.)

Leaving

Technical staff
 Head coach:  Hrvoje Horvat Jr.
 Assistant coach:  Filip Mirkulovski

Notable former players
  Michael Allendorf
  Markus Baur
  Sven-Sören Christophersen
  Lars Kaufmann
  Jannik Kohlbacher
  Andreas Wolff
  Tobias Reichmann
  Steffen Fäth
  Ivano Balić
  Ola Lindgren
  Kent Robin Tønnesen
  Avishay Smoler

External links

 Official website

Handball-Bundesliga
Sport in Wetzlar
German handball clubs
Handball clubs established in 1904
1904 establishments in Germany